DD Metro also known as DD 2 was an Indian free-to-air television channel. It was launched in 1984 as DD2 in Delhi as an alternative to DD National. Later, it increased its coverage area by expanding to Mumbai, Kolkata and Chennai. In 1993, the channel was rebranded as DD-2 Metro. On 3 November 2003, the Prasar Bharati Corporation replaced DD Metro with their new news channel, DD News.

DD Metro programming consisted of many genres of television programmes, including family dramas boasting women as main characters, comedies, reality TV shows and others. The channel's prime-time shift Metro Gold was a landmark in Indian television history, and it replaced Star Plus as the top Hindi-language entertainment channel in 2000 and 2001. DD Metro also used to broadcast some TV series from its sister channel, DD National. In addition, DD Metro was also known for dubbing English and other language movies into Hindi.

Programmes

Aap Ki Taarif
Aane Wala Pal
Ahankaar
Ajnabi
All The Best
Bandhan
Betaal Pachisi
Bhabhi Maa
Captain House
Chandrakanta
Champion
Dard
Dhun Dhamaka
Dekh Bhai Dekh
Deewar
Duniya Ki Saire Kar Lo
Ekka Begum Badshah
Ek Raja Ek Rani
Hello Bombay
Hello Inspector
Hindustani
Idhar Kamaal Udhar Dhamaal
Imtihaan
Intezaar Aur Sahi
Jai Hanuman
Jannat
Jaane Bhi Do Paaro
Jeevan Ke Pal Do Pal
Juhi
Kabhi Yeh Kabhi Woh
Kaliren
Khabrein Bollywood Ki
Kash-m-kash
Khatta Meetha
Lajwaab Talent Show
Laut Aao
Maan
Mahashakti
Meri Mrs. Chanchala
Mr. Dhansukh
Music Station
Musibat Bolkey Aayee
Nehle Pe Dehla
Nukkad
Nyaay
Peechha Karo
Padosan
Papa
Raja Aur Rancho
Rozana
The Samwaad Show
Saahil
Sapnay
Sea Hawks
Strivers & Achievers
Sweekar Hai Mujhe
Superhit Muqabla
Teletubbies
Tiger
Tu Tu Main Main
Wanderlust India
Yeh Jo Hai Zindagi
Zabaan Sambhalke

See also
Doordarshan Network
DD National
List of television stations in India
Metro Gold

References

External links
Doordarshan Network Official Site

Defunct television channels in India
Television stations in Mumbai
Doordarshan
Television channels and stations established in 1984
Television channels and stations disestablished in 2003